CaixaForum is a series of museums, galleries and exhibition centres sponsored by Catalan bank and not-for-profit La Caixa.

It has the following locations:
 CaixaForum Barcelona
 CaixaForum Madrid
 CaixaForum Lleida
 CaixaForum Palma
 CaixaForum Tarragona
 CaixaForum Zaragoza
 CaixaForum Sevilla
 CaixaForum Valencia (under construction, opening 2021)

References

Museums in Spain
La Caixa